Jakub Novotný (born 20 April 1979) is a Czech former professional volleyball player, a former member of the Czech Republic national team.

Career
With PGE Skra Bełchatów he won two titles of the Polish Champion (2010, 2011), Polish Cup and a bronze medal of the Champions League, two silver medals of the Club World Championship (2009, 2010). In 2011 he left club from Bełchatów and came back to Czech Republic. He was playing in Jihostroj České Budějovice for 2 seasons and then he decided to end up his career.

He serves as sports director of the Czech Volleyball Federation.

Honours

Clubs
 FIVB Club World Championship
  Doha 2009 – with PGE Skra Bełchatów
  Doha 2010 – with PGE Skra Bełchatów

 National championships
 2009/2010  Polish Championship, with PGE Skra Bełchatów
 2010/2011  Polish Cup, with PGE Skra Bełchatów
 2010/2011  Polish Championship, with PGE Skra Bełchatów
 2011/2012  Czech Championship, with Jihostroj České Budějovice
 2012/2013  Czech Championship, with Jihostroj České Budějovice

External links

 
 Player profile at LegaVolley.it 
 Player profile at PlusLiga.pl 
 Player profile at Volleybox.net

1979 births
Living people
People from Sokolov
Sportspeople from the Karlovy Vary Region
Czech men's volleyball players
Czech expatriate sportspeople in France
Expatriate volleyball players in France
Czech expatriate sportspeople in Italy
Expatriate volleyball players in Italy
Czech expatriate sportspeople in Greece
Expatriate volleyball players in Greece
Czech expatriate sportspeople in Poland
Expatriate volleyball players in Poland
Panathinaikos V.C. players
ZAKSA Kędzierzyn-Koźle players
Skra Bełchatów players
Opposite hitters